Simon Zöllner (1821 – October 17, 1880) was an Australian iron and steel manufacturer, metal and alloy manufacturer and metal goods manufacturer. Zöllner was born in Posen (Poznan), Prussia and died in Potts Point, Sydney, New South Wales.

Zollner's main business interest was the Sydney Galvanizing Works, which by 1870 employed fifty-two men and boys and used fifteen to eighteen tons of black sheet-iron a week to manufacture galvanized iron products.

In 1862-1863, he was one of four prominent new shareholders that reformed the company operating the Fitzroy Iron Works at Mittagong.

See also

 Ebenezer Vickery

References

German emigrants to Australia
1821 births
1880 deaths
19th-century Australian businesspeople
Date of birth unknown